Shaun M. Jordan (born February 1, 1968) is an American former competition swimmer who was highly successful as a member of the U.S. freestyle relay teams in the 1988 and 1992 Summer Olympics.

Jordan won two Olympic gold medals.  At the 1988 Summer Olympics in Seoul, South Korea, he earned his first gold medal by the winning U.S. men's team in the qualifying heats of the 4×100-meter freestyle.  He received his second gold medal at the 1992 Summer Olympics in Barcelona, Spain, again by swimming in the preliminary heats for the first-place U.S. team in the 4×100-meter freestyle.

Jordan won a gold medal in the 4×100-meter freestyle relay and a bronze in the individual 100-meter freestyle at the 1991 Pan Pacific Swimming Championships.  He attended the University of Texas at Austin, where he swam for coach Eddie Reese's Texas Longhorns swimming and diving team from 1988 to 1991.  He was a member of the Longhorns' four consecutive NCAA national championships team, and he was also a three-time NCAA individual national champion: the 50-yard freestyle (1991); 100-yard freestyle (1989 and 1991); and was a 50-yard and 100-yard freestyle Southwest Conference record holder.  Jordan holds the Texas Longhorns' 100-yard freestyle record and was captain of the Longhorns' 1990-91 NCAA national championship team.  The second time Shaun played golf he shot a hole-in-one.

He graduated from the University of Texas with a bachelor's degree in economics in 1991.  In 1997 he received his master of business administration (M.B.A.) degree with a focus in marketing from the University of Texas.  He works as a marketing director at Abraham Trading Company, a managed futures commodity trading advisor (CTA).

See also
 List of Olympic medalists in swimming (men)
 List of University of Texas at Austin alumni

References

External links
 
 

1968 births
Living people
American male freestyle swimmers
Olympic gold medalists for the United States in swimming
Sportspeople from Jacksonville, Florida
Swimmers at the 1988 Summer Olympics
Swimmers at the 1992 Summer Olympics
Texas Longhorns men's swimmers
Medalists at the 1992 Summer Olympics
Medalists at the 1988 Summer Olympics
Swimmers from Florida
20th-century American people
21st-century American people